The  is a DC electric multiple unit (EMU) train type operated by the private railway operator Keisei Electric Railway on commuter services in the Tokyo area of Japan since 2003. A total of 19 eight-car sets and 29 six-car sets have been built by J-TREC (formerly Tokyu Car Corporation) and Nippon Sharyo between 2002 and 2019.

Operations
The eight-car sets are used on inter-running services via the Toei Asakusa Line to and from the Keikyu Main Line.

Seventh-batch eight-car sets (often referred to as the 3050 series) are primarily used on the Narita Sky Access Line.

Formations
, the fleet consists of 12 eight-car sets (3001, 3026 to 3030, and 3051 to 3056) and 26 six-car sets (3002 to 3025 and 3031 to 3032) formed as shown below. Car 6/8 is at the Narita Airport end.

8-car sets

 "xx" corresponds to the set number.
 Cars 2 and 7 each have two single-arm pantographs, and car 5 is fitted with one.

6-car sets

 "xx" corresponds to the set number.
 Cars 2 and 5 each have two single-arm pantographs.

Interior
Seating accommodation consists of longitudinal bench seating throughout. From 31 March 2013, WiMAX wireless broadband internet access was provided on all sets numbered 3051 onward.

History
An eighth eight-car set, 3026, was delivered from the Nippon Sharyo factory in Toyokawa, Aichi in January 2013, approximately three years after the previous set was built.

Fleet build details
The build histories for the most recent 3000 series sets are as shown below. Two six-car sets, 3031 and 3032, were delivered during fiscal 2015, entering revenue service in February and March 2016 respectively. These trains feature interior LED lighting.

Livery variations
Sets 3051 to 3056 were delivered with a blue airport-access livery.

In 2019, the livery of set 3052 was changed to match that of the then-new Keisei 3100 series trains, with four other 3050 subseries sets scheduled to be re-liveried the same way in the future. 

Starting from December 2019, 3050 subseries trains were re-liveried to match that of the 3000 series fleet. As of November 2021, sets 3051, 3052, 3053, and 3054 have been re-liveried.

See also
 Shin-Keisei N800 series, a derivative for use on the Shin-Keisei Line since 2005
 Hokuso 7500 series, a derivative for use on the Hokuso Line since 2006
 Chiba New Town Railway 9200 series, a derivative for use on the Hokuso Line since 2013

References

External links

 Keisei 3000 series (Japan Railfan Magazine Online) 
 Nippon Sharyo details 
 Keisei 3050 series (Japan Railfan Magazine Online) 
 Nippon Sharyo 3050 series description 

Keisei Electric Railway
Electric multiple units of Japan
Train-related introductions in 2003
Nippon Sharyo multiple units
1500 V DC multiple units of Japan
Tokyu Car multiple units
J-TREC multiple units